OPNET Technologies, Inc. was a software business that provided performance management for computer networks and applications.

The company was founded in 1986 and went public in 2000. In October 2012, OPNET was acquired by Riverbed Technology, for about $1 billion US dollars.

Corporate history
"OPNET" was Alain Cohen's (co-founder, CTO & President) graduate project for a networking course while he was at MIT. OPNET stood for Optimized Network Engineering Tools. Alain, along with brother Marc (co-founder, CEO & Chairman) and classmate Steven Baraniuk, decided to commercialize the software. The company's first product was OPNET Modeler, a software tool for computer network modeling and simulation.

Since becoming a public company in August 2000, OPNET executed the following acquisitions: 
March 2001: NetMaker Division of Make Systems
January 2002: WDM NetDesign B.V.B.A
October 2004: Altaworks Corporation
October 2007: substantially all of the assets of Network Physics, Inc.
August 2010: DSAuditor product line from Embarcadero Technologies 
May 2012: Clarus Systems, Inc.

As an independent company, OPNET grew profitably throughout its history.  SEC filings are available with further information about its IPO, annual reports, and quarterly reports.

OPNET Solutions (prior to acquisition by Riverbed)
 Application performance management, see AppTransaction Xpert in Comparison of packet analyzers
 Network performance management
 Network Simulator

Notes

External links
 OPNET's website

Companies formerly listed on the Nasdaq
Companies established in 1986
Networking software companies
Networking hardware companies
1986 establishments in Maryland